Crevasse Valley Glacier is a broad glacier about  long, flowing west-southwest between the Chester Mountains and the Saunders Mountain to the Sulzberger Ice Shelf in Marie Byrd Land, Antarctica. It was discovered by a sledging party of the Byrd Antarctic Expedition, which visited this area in November–December 1934, and so named because of its extensively crevassed surface.

See also
 List of glaciers in the Antarctic
 Glaciology

References
 

Glaciers of Marie Byrd Land